A subsidiary of Teleflex, Inc., Norland Plastics Co. is located in Haysville, Kansas.  Founded in 1978, Norland now makes quality automotive injection molded parts for Ford, Nissan, GM. Its facilities were destroyed by a tornado in 1999, but were rebuilt.

References

Auto parts suppliers of the United States